Sir Claude James Hayes  (23 March 1912 – 20 November 1996) was a British civil servant who was Chairman of Crown Agents for Oversea Governments and Administrations from 1968 to 1974.

He was educated at Ardingly College, graduated with a first class degree from St Edmund Hall, Oxford. He held a fellowship at the Sorbonne and was briefly a tutor at New College, Oxford.

He was made KCMG in 1974, having been made CMG in 1969.

References

1912 births
1996 deaths
Alumni of St Edmund Hall, Oxford
British civil servants
Knights Commander of the Order of St Michael and St George
People educated at Ardingly College